Lakeland Christian Academy is a private, non-denominational Christian school located in Winona Lake, Indiana.

Demographics
The demographic breakdown of the 148 students enrolled in 2017-18 was:
Black - 1.4%
Hispanic - 2.0%
Native Hawaiian/Pacific islanders - 2.0%
White - 94.6%

Affiliations 
NCA CASI - North Central Association Commission on Accreditation and School Improvement

See also
 List of high schools in Indiana

References

External links  

Christian schools in Indiana
Schools in Kosciusko County, Indiana
Private schools in Indiana
1974 establishments in Indiana